The defending champions were Jana Novotná and Helena Suková, but chose not to participate. Larisa Neiland and Natasha Zvereva won the title, defeating Meredith McGrath and Samantha Smith in the final, 6–4, 7–6(7–3).

Seeds 
The top four seeds received a bye to the second round.

Draw

Finals

Top half

Bottom half

References

External links 
 ITF tournament edition details

Virginia Slims of Florida
Virginia Slims of Florida
Virginia Slims of Florida
Virginia Slims of Florida
Virginia Slims of Florida